Utena Dam is a gravity dam located in Ehime Prefecture in Japan. The dam is used for flood control and water supply. The catchment area of the dam is 4.9 km2. The dam impounds about 16  ha of land when full and can store 1790 thousand cubic meters of water. The construction of the dam was started on 1982 and completed in 1991.

References

Dams in Ehime Prefecture
1991 establishments in Japan